In computational geometry, the method of rotating calipers is an algorithm design technique that can be used to solve optimization problems including finding the width or diameter of a set of points.

The method is so named because the idea is analogous to rotating a spring-loaded vernier caliper around the outside of a convex polygon. Every time one blade of the caliper lies flat against an edge of the polygon, it forms an antipodal pair with the point or edge touching the opposite blade. The complete "rotation" of the caliper around the polygon detects all antipodal pairs; the set of all pairs, viewed as a graph, forms a thrackle. The method of rotating calipers can be interpreted as the projective dual of a sweep line algorithm in which the sweep is across slopes of lines rather than across - or -coordinates of points.

History 

The rotating calipers method was first used in the dissertation of Michael Shamos in 1978. Shamos uses this method to generate all antipodal pairs of points on a convex polygon and to compute the diameter of a convex polygon in  time. Godfried Toussaint coined the phrase "rotating calipers" and also demonstrated that the method was applicable in solving many other computational geometry problems.

Shamos's algorithm 
Shamos gave following algorithm in his dissertation (pp 77–82) for the rotating calipers method that generated all antipodal pairs of vertices on convex polygon:

/* p[] is in standard form, ie, counter clockwise order, 
     distinct vertices, no collinear vertices.
   ANGLE(m, n) is a procedure that returns the clockwise angle 
     swept out by a ray as it rotates from a position parallel 
     to the directed segment Pm,Pm+1 to a position parallel to Pn, Pn+1
   We assume all indices are reduced to mod N (so that N+1 = 1).
*/
GetAllAntiPodalPairs(p[1..n])
    // Find first anti-podal pair by locating vertex opposite P1
    i = 1
    j = 2
    while angle(i, j) < pi
        j++
    yield i, j

    /* Now proceed around the polygon taking account of
         possibly parallel edges. Line L passes through
         Pi, Pi+1 and M passes through Pj, Pj+1
    */

    // Loop on j until all of P has been scanned
    current = i    
    while j != n
        if angle(current, i + 1) <= angle(current, j + 1)
            j++
            current = j
        else
            i++
            current = i
        yield i, j

        // Now take care of parallel edges
        if angle(current, i + 1) = angle(current, j + 1)
            yield i + 1, j
            yield i, j + 1
            yield i + 1, j + 1
            if current = i
                j++
            else
                i++

Another version of this algorithm appeared in the text by Preparata and Shamos in 1985 that avoided calculation of angles:

GetAllAntiPodalPairs(p[1..n])
    i0 = n
    i = 1
    j = i + 1
    while (Area(i, i + 1, j + 1) > Area(i, i + 1, j))
        j = j + 1
        j0 = j
    while (j != i0)
        i = i + 1
        yield i, j
        while (Area(i, i + 1, j + 1) > Area(i, i + 1, j))
            j = j + 1
            if ((i, j) != (j0, i0))
                yield i, j
            else 
                return
        if (Area(j, i + 1, j + 1) = Area(i, i + 1, j))
            if ((i, j) != (j0, i0))
                yield i, j + 1
            else 
                yield i + 1, j

Applications 

Pirzadeh describes various applications of rotating calipers method.

Distances 
 Diameter (maximum width) of a convex polygon
 Width (minimum width) of a convex polygon
 Maximum distance between two convex polygons
 Minimum distance between two convex polygons
 Widest empty (or separating) strip between two convex polygons (a simplified low-dimensional variant of a problem arising in support vector machine based machine learning)
 Grenander distance between two convex polygons
 Optimal strip separation (used in medical imaging and solid modeling)

Bounding boxes 
 Minimum area oriented bounding box
 Minimum perimeter oriented bounding box

Triangulations 
 Onion triangulations
 Spiral triangulations
 Quadrangulation
 Nice triangulation
 Art gallery problem
 Wedge placement optimization problem

Multi-polygon operations 
 Union of two convex polygons
 Common tangents to two convex polygons
 Intersection of two convex polygons
 Critical support lines of two convex polygons
 Vector sums (or Minkowski sum) of two convex polygons
 Convex hull of two convex polygons

Traversals 
 Shortest transversals
 Thinnest-strip transversals

Others 
 Non parametric decision rules for machine learned classification
 Aperture angle optimizations for visibility problems in computer vision
 Finding longest cells in millions of biological cells
 Comparing precision of two people at firing range
 Classify sections of brain from scan images

See also 
 Convex polygon
 Convex hull
 Smallest enclosing box

References

Geometric algorithms
Convex geometry